In molecular biology, snoRNA HBII-210 belongs to the C/D family of snoRNAs. It is the human orthologue of the mouse MBII-210 and is predicted to guide the 2'O-ribose methylation of large 28S rRNA on residue G4464.

References

External links 
 

Small nuclear RNA